Independence Center is a rehabilitation center for people with psychiatric disorders in St. Louis, Missouri. It uses the Clubhouse Model of Psychosocial Rehabilitation and is modeled after New York City's Fountain House.  It was founded in 1980 by Robert B. "Bob" Harvey. IC also participates in the Transitional Employment Program (TEP), and colleague training.

See also
 Mental health
 National Alliance on Mental Illness
 National Institute for Mental Health
 Clubhouse Model of Psychosocial Rehabilitation

References

External links

International Center for Clubhouse Development

Mental health organizations in Missouri
1980 establishments in Missouri

Organizations established in 1980